Wydra may refer to:

Wydra, Silesian Voivodeship, a village in southern Poland
Wydra (surname), a Polish surname

See also
 
Vydra (disambiguation)

fi:Saukko (täsmennyssivu)